Ellenton may refer to:
 Ellenton, Florida
 Ellenton, Georgia
 Ellenton, South Carolina